Valeriy Kryventsov (born 30 July 1973 in Donetsk) is a retired Ukrainian professional footballer, who was most recently the manager of Metalist 1925 Kharkiv.

He made his professional debut in the Ukrainian Premier League in 1991 for FC Shakhtar Donetsk.

Honours
 Ukrainian Premier League runner-up: 1994, 1997, 1998, 1999, 2000, 2001.
 Ukrainian Cup winner: 1995, 1997, 2001.

External links

1973 births
Living people
Footballers from Donetsk
Ukrainian footballers
Ukraine international footballers
Ukrainian expatriate footballers
Expatriate footballers in Kazakhstan
Ukrainian Premier League players
Ukrainian First League players
Ukrainian Second League players
Kazakhstan Premier League players
FC Shakhtar Donetsk players
FC Shakhtar-2 Donetsk players
FC Metalurh Kostiantynivka players
FC Metalurh Donetsk players
FC Metalurh-2 Donetsk players
FC Metalurh Zaporizhzhia players
FC Volyn Lutsk players
FC Aktobe players
Ukrainian expatriate sportspeople in Kazakhstan
Ukrainian football managers
FC Mariupol managers
Association football defenders
FC Shakhtar Donetsk non-playing staff
FC Metalist 1925 Kharkiv managers
Ukrainian Premier League managers
Ukrainian First League managers
Ukraine under-21 international footballers